Staelia is a genus of flowering plants belonging to the family Rubiaceae.

Its native range is Brazil to northern Argentina.

The genus name of Staelia is in honour of Auguste Louis de Staël-Holstein (1790–1827), a French philanthropist. 
It was first described and published in Linnaea Vol.3 on page 364 in 1828.

Known species
According to Kew:
Staelia aurea 
Staelia catolensis 
Staelia culcita 
Staelia domingosii 
Staelia galioides 
Staelia glandulosa 
Staelia harleyi 
Staelia hassleri 
Staelia hatschbachii 
Staelia juarezii 
Staelia longipedicellata 
Staelia nelidae 
Staelia paganuccii 
Staelia reflexa 
Staelia thymbroides 
Staelia thymoides 
Staelia tocantinsiana 
Staelia uruguaya 
Staelia vestita 
Staelia virgata

References

Rubiaceae
Rubiaceae genera
Plants described in 1828
Flora of Brazil
Flora of Northeast Argentina
Flora of Northwest Argentina